Naked Raygun is an American punk rock band that formed in Chicago in 1980. The band was active from 1980 to 1992, along with reunion shows in 1997, and since 2006.

History

Initial run
The band was formed in 1980 by Santiago Durango, Marko Pezzati and later Jeff Pezzati. Singer Jeff Pezzati was the sole constant member through multiple personnel changes. Members over time include drummers Bobby Strange, Jim Colao, and Eric Spicer; bassists Marko Pezzati, Pierre Kezdy, Camilo Gonzalez, Pete Mittler and Fritz Doreza; guitarists Santiago Durango, John Haggerty, and Bill Stephens; and keyboardist John Lundin.

Durango and Jeff Pezzati were also members of Big Black.

Post-Naked Raygun 
In 1989, John Haggerty left Naked Raygun to form Pegboy with his younger brother Joe (formerly of Bloodsport and The Effigies) and Steve Saylors and Larry Damore of the Bhopal Stiffs (Pierre Kezdy would later replace Steve Saylors).

Jeff Pezzati is also the lead singer of The Bomb, which is a different and later band than the San Francisco group, known as "Bomb".

Reunions
A two-show reunion in 1997 produced the live album Free Shit!.

In 1999, the independent record label Quarterstick Records re-issued the band's back catalog on CD.

In 2006 Naked Raygun reunited for Riot Fest, an annual punk rock festival held in Chicago. Following their 2006 reunion, Naked Raygun announced that the band was "back for good." The reunited lineup consists of its "Raygun...Naked Raygun" members: Pezzati, Stephens, Kezdy, and Spicer. In 2009 Naked Raygun returned to the studio for the first time since 1997 for a series of 7-inch singles released on Riot Fest Records and announced plans to record an LP, the first since 1990's Raygun... Naked Raygun.

In 2011, Pete Mittler of The Methadones joined the line-up so that longtime bassist Pierre Kezdy could convalesce from a stroke.

In August 2014, Naked Raygun opened for Bad Religion, The Offspring and Stiff Little Fingers on the last two shows of the Summer Nationals tour at The Rave in Milwaukee and Harrah's Stir Cove in Council Bluffs, Iowa.

Naked Raygun (along with Urge Overkill and Cheap Trick) opened for the Foo Fighters at Wrigley Field, Chicago, on August 29, 2015.

Although the band announced plans to release a new album in 2016, no recordings were released until 2021's Over The Overlords.

Pierre Kezdy died of cancer on October 9, 2020.

Legacy
Nirvana drummer and Foo Fighters frontman Dave Grohl has frequently discussed seeing Naked Raygun as his first concert in 1982 (when he was 13) at Chicago's Cubby Bear. During their October 17, 2014, show at the Cubby Bear, Jeff Pezatti joined the band for a Naked Raygun cover. Naked Raygun themselves later opened for Foo Fighters on select dates during the Sonic Highways World Tour.

Blink-182’s Matt Skiba references Naked Raygun in the song “Parking Lot” from their California album.

Discography

Albums
 Throb Throb LP (Homestead Records) (1985)/(Quarterstick) (1999–CD only)/(Haunted Town) (2008–LP only)
 All Rise LP (Homestead) (1986)/(Quarterstick) (1999–CD only)/(Haunted Town) (2008–LP only)
 Jettison LP Caroline (1988)/(Quarterstick) (1999 – CD only)
 Understand? LP (Caroline) (1989)/(Quarterstick) (1999–CD only)
 Raygun...Naked Raygun LP (Caroline) (1990)/Quarterstick (1999–CD only)
 Last of the Demohicans CD (Dyslexic) (1997)
 Free Shit LP/CD (Haunted Town) (2001) - live
 Over the Overlords LP (Wax Trax!) (2021)

EPs
 Basement Screams 12-inch (Ruthless (1983)/(Quarterstick) (1999 – CD only)/(Haunted Town) (2007 – LP only)
 Treason 12-inch (Caroline) (1989) - on pink vinyl limited to 2,500 numbered records (although unnumbered versions, stamped "Promo only" exist)

Singles
 Flammable Solid 7-inch (Ruthless) (1983) - "Surf Combat", "Gear"/"Libido"
 Vanilla Blue 7-inch (Sandpounder) (1987) - "Vanilla Blue"/"Slim (The Second Coming Of Christ) [on white/light blue marbled vinyl]
 Home 7-inch (Caroline) (1990) - "Home"/"Last Drink" [on green vinyl]
 Series 1 7-inch (Riot Fest) (2009) - "Mein Iron Maiden"/"Out Of Your Mind" [on red & on cream vinyl]
 Series 2 7-inch (Riot Fest) (2010) - "Growing Away"/"Just For Me" [on violet & on black vinyl]
 Series 3 7-inch (Riot Fest) (2011) - "Burning Red"/"Black Eyed Blue" [on clear orange vinyl]

Compilations
Huge Bigness-Selected Tracks From Collected Works 1980-1992 (Quarterstick) (1999)
What Poor Gods We Do Make: The Story And Music Behind Naked Raygun (Riot Fest) (2007) [included with DVD of same name]
Totally...Naked Raygun 5XCD (Audio Platter) (2021)

Compilation appearances
Busted At Oz (Autum/Permanent) (1981/2011) - "Bomb Shelter", "When The Screaming Stops", "Paranoia", "Libido" 
Bang Zoom Issue #4 cassette (Bang Zoom) (1984) - "Swingo"
Code Blue cassette (Last Rites) (1984) - "No Sex", "Only In America"
The Middle Of America Compilation (H.I.D. Productions) (1984) - "I Don't Know", "Stupid"
Flipside Vinyl Fanzine #2 (Flipside) (1985) - "Metastasis"
Gunfire & Pianos (Situation Two/ZigZag Magazine) (1986) - "Metastasis"
Paranoia You Can Dance To (Weird System) (1986) - "Metastasis"
Sub Pop 100 (Sub Pop) (1986) - "Bananacuda"
Rat Music For Rat People Vol. III (CD Presents) (1987) - "Rocks Of Sweden"
Rat Music For Rat People Vol. I, II & III (CD Presents) (1987) - "Rocks Of Sweden"
Untitled 7-inch EP (Discopêö) (1987) - "Peacemaker (live)"
The Wailing Ultimate-The Homestead Records Compilation ([Homestead Records|Homestead]) (1987) - "I Remember"
Sounds And Shigaku Limited Present: Beautiful Happiness (Sounds And Shigaku Limited) (1988) - "Vanilla Blue"
Live Treatment cassette (Shotgunning Tape SXXXXX Inc./Discraceland) (1989) - "Never Follow"
Somethings's Gone Wrong Again: The Buzzcocks Covers Compilation (C/Z) (1992) - "Love Battery"
The Best Of Flipside Vinyl Fanzine 2XCD (Flipside) (1993) - "Metastasis"
Faster & Louder-Hardcore Punk, Vol. 2 (Rhino) (1993) - "Metastasis"
Nightmare/Bad Taste-News Vol. 10 cassette (Bad Taste) (1998) - "Rat Patrol"
Rats In The Hallway #14 (Rats In The Hallway) (2000) - "Treason"
Haunted Town Records CD Sampler #1 CDr (Haunted Town) (2008) - "I Lie", "Backlash Jack"
 You Weren't There movie soundtrack (Factory 25) (2009) - "Tojo (demo)"
... On The Rawks Compilation (ProRawk) (2020) - "Broken Things"

Video
 "Broken Things"
 "Home"
 "Living in The Good Times"
 "Vanilla Blue"
 "What Poor Gods We Do Make" DVD (Riot Fest) (2007) [included with CD of same name]

Members

Current members
 Jeff Pezzati - Vocals (1980–1992, 2006–present)
 Bill Stephens - Guitar (1989–1992, 2006–present)
 Eric Spicer - Drums (1984–1992, 2006–present)
 Fritz Doreza - Bass (2013–present)

Former members
 Santiago Durango - Guitar (1980–1983)
 Marko Pezzati - Bass (1980–1981)
 Bobby Strange - Drums (1980)
 Jim Colao - Drums (1980–1984)
 John Lundin - Drums, Keyboards (1980–1981)
 Camilo Gonzalez - Bass (1981–1985)
 John Haggerty - Guitar (1983–1989)
 Sensitive Pete Mittler - Bass (2011-2013)
 Pierre Kezdy - Bass (1985–1992, 2006–2020); died 2020
 Steev Custer - Guitar/Bass (2014)

Timeline

See also
 You Weren't There: A History of Chicago Punk 1977-1984 (dir. Joe Losurdo and Christina Tillman) (2007) - Documentary

References

External links

Official Naked Raygun Website
Maximumrocknroll Article – Naked Raygun article from 1984
Naked Raygun: Combat Rock Interview with Roy Christopher, 2008
"Vanilla Blue" music video on YouTube

American post-punk music groups
Punk rock groups from Illinois
Musical groups from Chicago
Musical groups established in 1980
Musical groups disestablished in 1992
Musical groups reestablished in 2006
Musical quartets
Ruthless Records (Chicago) artists
Homestead Records artists
Caroline Records artists
Quarterstick Records artists